Priests of the Sacred Heart of Jesus may refer to two distinct Roman Catholic orders:

Congregation of the Sacred Heart of Jesus, founded by Joseph-Marie Timon-David  in 1852
Priests of the Sacred Heart, founded by Leon Dehon in 1878